SX3, styled Super3 until 2022, is a Catalan public television channel owned by Televisió de Catalunya in Catalan language. It started broadcasting on 18 October 2009. The channel's programs are aimed at children and teenagers. It is based on the programme Club Super3, that started on 11 February 1991 on TV3 and has been seen on El 33 and on K3.

In contrast to K3, which broadcast children and youth programming, SX3 airs series aimed at an audience younger than 14 years. A mix of live-action originals and animated series from a wide variety of countries, including Japan, are aired, all in the Catalan language.

The schedule is not differentiated by specific blocks, so programs for preschoolers, older kids and teenagers all air throughout the course of the day.

SX3 broadcasts on DTT from 6 am to 9:55 pm, sharing the channel frequency El 33 for cultural and alternative programming. However, SX3 is broadcast online 24/7, where some programs are broadcast exclusively, because the CCMA sought to prioritize online consumption over traditional TV. It replaced K3.

Super3's fan club has more than 1.5 million members.
The channel was rebranded as SX3 on October 10, 2022.

History
The Club Super3 brand started on February 11, 1991, as a programming strand on TV3 and later Canal 33. Following the growth of the slots dedicated to children's programming on 33, TVC announced a restructuring of its two channels. Therefore, on April 23, 2001, K3 started broadcasting, timesharing with Canal 33.

The channel rebranded in December 2006, with its digital slot timesharing with Canal 300, allowing El 33 to broadcast 24/7 on the digital terrestrial platform (the analog version still timeshared with El 33).

The 2009 Festa dels Súpers led to the rename of K3 to Canal Super3, thus unifying it with the branding of Club Super3. Among the priorities of the rebranded channel were the usage of English and interaction with the viewer, aiming for viewers to send their drawings or show their pets to the channel. The channel ended its analog broadcast on February 15, 2010, with the analog frequencies broadcasting El 33 for the whole day.

The channel was losing ratings from the late 2010s onward, achieving a record low in October 2019: a negative share of 0,6%, a small fraction of the ratings the three national terrestrial kids channels (and Super3's competitors) have in Catalonia. TVC, facing rating and financial issues, started to draw strategies to keep the brand afloat. The channel cancelled La família dels Súpers in June 2021. The decision also coincided with the aggravation of the factors that led to the Super3 crisis: half of the supposed target group no longer watched television, leading to problems in buying content, while rethinking Super3 with a digital-first structure to continue offering content in the language across all platforms.

In September 2022, CCMA announced the rebrand of the channel as SX3, divided in two strands: S3 for pre-schoolers and X3 for school-aged kids and preteens. The channel broadcasts 24/7 online, yet the terrestrial service still timeshares with El 33 after 9:55 pm.

References

External links
 Canal Super3

Televisió de Catalunya
Television stations in Spain
Catalan-language television stations
Television stations in Catalonia
Children's television networks
Television channels and stations established in 2009
Preschool education television networks